The aquatic genet (Genetta piscivora) is a genet that has only been recorded in the northeast of the Democratic Republic of the Congo. Since it is only known from about 30 specimens in zoological collections, it had been listed as Data Deficient on the IUCN Red List since 1996, as it is considered one of Africa's rarest carnivores. In 2015, it has been reassessed as Near Threatened.

When Allen described the aquatic genet as a new genus and species in 1919, he named it Osbornictis piscivora. It was reassessed in 2004, and based on molecular evidence is now considered a Genetta species.

Characteristics
The aquatic genet's long and dense fur is dark chestnut red without spots or bands. The head is pale fuscous brown with white spots on the sides of the muzzle, and above and below the eyes, which are framed with a narrow black ring. The ears are almost naked inside, edged with long whitish hairs and blackish outside. The bushy tail is black with pale brownish underfur. The soles of its feet are naked. These characteristics differ strikingly from those of other genet species. Its rhinarium and olfactory bulbs are smaller than in other genets, which may indicate a poorly developed sense of smell. Its trenchant teeth indicate an adaptation to piscivory.

Distribution and habitat
They have not been recorded with certainty from Uganda. Based on past records, their range is predicted to be limited to closed evergreen lowland and submontane forests in the Congo Basin.

Ecology and behavior
Aquatic genets are thought to be solitary and crepuscular. They primarily feed on freshwater fish, including catfish, barbels, squeakers, carps, and also crustaceans. They possibly detect the movements of the fish with their whiskers, or attract the fish by patting the surface of the water with their whiskers.

A pregnant female was collected in December. To date, nothing else is known about their gestation, reproduction and development of offspring.

Threats
It is unclear whether there are any major threats to aquatic genets. They are caught in snare traps set up by Pygmy people in the Ituri Forest.

Conservation 
In 1979, the aquatic genet has been given full protection by the Congolese government. It is assumed to be present in the Okapi Wildlife Reserve.

References

External links
 Animal Diversity Web: Genetta piscivora

Genets (animals)
Fauna of Central Africa
Mammals of the Democratic Republic of the Congo
Mammals described in 1919
Northeastern Congolian lowland forests
Endemic fauna of the Democratic Republic of the Congo